The Sam Epstein House is a historic house at 488 Lakeshore Drive in Lake Village, Arkansas. He was active in the civic and economic life of the community, supporting others (most notably H. L. Hunt) in the development of business opportunities.

The house was listed on the National Register of Historic Places in 1992.

See also
National Register of Historic Places listings in Chicot County, Arkansas

References

Houses on the National Register of Historic Places in Arkansas
Colonial Revival architecture in Arkansas
Houses in Chicot County, Arkansas
National Register of Historic Places in Chicot County, Arkansas
Lake Village, Arkansas